There are about 830 known moth species of Gabon. The moths (mostly nocturnal) and butterflies (mostly diurnal) together make up the taxonomic order Lepidoptera.

This is a list of moth species which have been recorded in Gabon.

Alucitidae
Alucita coffeina (Viette, 1958)

Anomoeotidae
Anomoeotes leucolena Holland, 1893
Anomoeotes tenellula Holland, 1893

Arctiidae
Acantharctia mundata (Walker, 1865)
Afraloa bifurca (Walker, 1855)
Afrasura clara (Holland, 1893)
Afrasura numida (Holland, 1893)
Afrasura obliterata (Walker, 1864)
Afroarctia bergeri Toulgoët, 1978
Amata creobota (Holland, 1893)
Amata goodii (Holland, 1893)
Amata interniplaga (Mabille, 1890)
Amata leimacis (Holland, 1893)
Amata leucerythra (Holland, 1893)
Amata marina (Butler, 1876)
Amerila brunnea (Hampson, 1901)
Amerila luteibarba (Hampson, 1901)
Amerila roseomarginata (Rothschild, 1910)
Anapisa crenophylax (Holland, 1893)
Anapisa melaleuca (Holland, 1898)
Anapisa monotica (Holland, 1893)
Apisa canescens Walker, 1855
Apisa cinereocostata Holland, 1893
Archilema subumbrata (Holland, 1893)
Archithosia costimacula (Mabille, 1878)
Asura erythrias (Holland, 1893)
Asura gubunica (Holland, 1893)
Asura temperata (Holland, 1893)
Balacra flavimacula Walker, 1856
Balacra haemalea Holland, 1893
Balacra pulchra Aurivillius, 1892
Balacra rubricincta Holland, 1893
Balacra rubrostriata (Aurivillius, 1892)
Caryatis phileta (Drury, 1782)
Ceryx albimacula (Walker, 1854)
Ceryx cybelistes (Holland, 1893)
Ceryx elasson (Holland, 1893)
Chrysaegliodes noliformis Strand, 1912
Creatonotos leucanioides Holland, 1893
Cyana africana (Holland, 1893)
Cyana rubristriga (Holland, 1893)
Eilema monochroma (Holland, 1893)
Euchromia guineensis (Fabricius, 1775)
Eugoa costiplaga Holland, 1893
Eugoa tropicalis Holland, 1893
Kiriakoffalia lemairei (Toulgoët, 1976)
Logunovium nigricosta (Holland, 1893)
Logunovium scortillum Wallengren, 1875
Lymantriopsis lacteata (Holland, 1893)
Mecistorhabdia haematoessa (Holland, 1893)
Meganaclia perpusilla (Walker, 1856)
Melisa diptera (Walker, 1854)
Metarctia haematica Holland, 1893
Metarctia paremphares Holland, 1893
Metarctia rubripuncta Hampson, 1898
Metarctia rufescens Walker, 1855
Muxta xanthopa (Holland, 1893)
Myopsyche cytogaster (Holland, 1893)
Myopsyche elachista (Holland, 1893)
Myopsyche miserabilis (Holland, 1893)
Myopsyche nervalis Strand, 1912
Myopsyche puncticincta (Holland, 1893)
Neophemula vitrina (Oberthür, 1909)
Neuroxena fulleri (Druce, 1883)
Nyctemera apicalis (Walker, 1854)
Nyctemera druna (Swinhoe, 1904)
Nyctemera hemixantha (Aurivillius, 1904)
Nyctemera perspicua (Walker, 1854)
Nyctemera xanthura (Plötz, 1880)
Paramelisa lophura Aurivillius, 1905
Paremonia luteicincta (Holland, 1893)
Pseudothyretes carnea (Hampson, 1898)
Pseudothyretes perpusilla (Walker, 1856)
Rhipidarctia invaria (Walker, 1856)
Rhipidarctia lutea (Holland, 1893)
Rhipidarctia pareclecta (Holland, 1893)
Spilosoma aurantiaca (Holland, 1893)
Spilosoma rava (Druce, 1898)
Stenarctia quadripunctata Aurivillius, 1900
Thumatha fuscescens Walker, 1866

Drepanidae
Epicampoptera erosa (Holland, 1893)
Epicampoptera strandi Bryk, 1913
Epicampoptera tumidula Watson, 1965
Isospidia brunneola (Holland, 1893)
Negera bimaculata (Holland, 1893)
Negera disspinosa Watson, 1965
Negera natalensis (Felder, 1874)
Spidia miserrima (Holland, 1893)
Uranometra oculata (Holland, 1893)

Eupterotidae
Camerunia orphne (Schaus, 1893)
Epijana cinerea Holland, 1893
Epijana cosima (Plötz, 1880)
Hoplojana rhodoptera (Gerstaecker, 1871)
Jana strigina Westwood, 1849
Parajana gabunica (Aurivillius, 1892)
Phiala subiridescens (Holland, 1893)
Stenoglene citrinus (Druce, 1886)
Vianga dimidiata (Aurivillius, 1893)

Geometridae
Acrostatheusis reducta Herbulot, 1967
Cleora rostella D. S. Fletcher, 1967
Ctenoberta abanga Prout, 1915
Cyclophora dewitzi (Prout, 1920)
Cyclophora diplosticta (Prout, 1918)
Dioptrochasma homochroa (Holland, 1893)
Gelasmodes fasciata (Warren, 1899)
Geodena absimilis Holland, 1893
Geodena notata (Holland, 1893)
Gongropteryx fasciata (Holland, 1893)
Megadrepana cinerea Holland, 1893
Melinoessa asteria Prout, 1934
Mesomima tenuifascia (Holland, 1893)
Miantochora picturata Herbulot, 1985
Mimaletis humilis Warren, 1894
Narthecusa tenuiorata Walker, 1862
Pitthea continua Walker, 1854
Plegapteryx anomalus Herrich-Schäffer, 1856
Scopula megalostigma (Prout, 1915)
Scopula plionocentra Prout, 1920
Somatina syneorus Prout, 1915
Sphingomima olivacea (Viette, 1954)
Terina charmione (Fabricius, 1793)
Terina maculifera Strand, 1911
Terina octogesa (Druce, 1887)
Terina reliqua Prout, 1925
Vaena eacleoides Walker, 1869
Zamarada aclys D. S. Fletcher, 1974
Zamarada acrochra Prout, 1928
Zamarada adumbrata D. S. Fletcher, 1974
Zamarada aerata D. S. Fletcher, 1974
Zamarada aglae Oberthür, 1912
Zamarada antimima D. S. Fletcher, 1974
Zamarada astales D. S. Fletcher, 1974
Zamarada astyphela D. S. Fletcher, 1974
Zamarada auratisquama Warren, 1897
Zamarada aurolineata Gaede, 1915
Zamarada bastelbergeri Gaede, 1915
Zamarada bernardii D. S. Fletcher, 1974
Zamarada bicuspida D. S. Fletcher, 1974
Zamarada bilobata D. S. Fletcher, 1974
Zamarada cathetus D. S. Fletcher, 1974
Zamarada catori Bethune-Baker, 1913
Zamarada cautela D. S. Fletcher, 1974
Zamarada cepa D. S. Fletcher, 1974
Zamarada cinereata D. S. Fletcher, 1974
Zamarada clavigera D. S. Fletcher, 1974
Zamarada clenchi D. S. Fletcher, 1974
Zamarada clio Oberthür, 1912
Zamarada corroborata Herbulot, 1954
Zamarada corymbophora D. S. Fletcher, 1974
Zamarada cydippe Herbulot, 1954
Zamarada dargei D. S. Fletcher, 1974
Zamarada dentigera Warren, 1909
Zamarada dialitha D. S. Fletcher, 1974
Zamarada dilata D. S. Fletcher, 1974
Zamarada dione D. S. Fletcher, 1974
Zamarada disparata D. S. Fletcher, 1974
Zamarada dolorosa D. S. Fletcher, 1974
Zamarada dyscapna D. S. Fletcher, 1974
Zamarada effa Pierre-Baltus, 2000
Zamarada emaciata D. S. Fletcher, 1974
Zamarada episema D. S. Fletcher, 1974
Zamarada eryma D. S. Fletcher, 1974
Zamarada euerces Prout, 1928
Zamarada ferruginata D. S. Fletcher, 1974
Zamarada flavicosta Warren, 1897
Zamarada fumosa Gaede, 1915
Zamarada gaedei D. S. Fletcher, 1974
Zamarada griseola D. S. Fletcher, 1974
Zamarada herbuloti D. S. Fletcher, 1974
Zamarada hero D. S. Fletcher, 1974
Zamarada ixiaria Swinhoe, 1904
Zamarada kala Herbulot, 1975
Zamarada kompsotes D. S. Fletcher, 1974
Zamarada labifera Prout, 1915
Zamarada laciniata D. S. Fletcher, 1974
Zamarada lanceolata D. S. Fletcher, 1974
Zamarada latimargo Warren, 1897
Zamarada loangensis Sircoulomb, 2008
Zamarada lope Pierre-Baltus, 2000
Zamarada lophobela D. S. Fletcher, 1974
Zamarada lorana Pierre-Baltus, 2006
Zamarada mackanga Pierre-Baltus, 2000
Zamarada manifesta D. S. Fletcher, 1974
Zamarada melanopyga Herbulot, 1954
Zamarada melpomene Oberthür, 1912
Zamarada merga D. S. Fletcher, 1974
Zamarada mimesis D. S. Fletcher, 1974
Zamarada miranda D. S. Fletcher, 1974
Zamarada odontis Pierre-Baltus, 2000
Zamarada ostracodes D. S. Fletcher, 1974
Zamarada paxilla D. S. Fletcher, 1974
Zamarada pelobasis D. S. Fletcher, 1974
Zamarada penthesis D. S. Fletcher, 1974
Zamarada phrontisaria Swinhoe, 1904
Zamarada protrusa Warren, 1897
Zamarada quadriplaga Pierre-Baltus, 2005
Zamarada radula D. S. Fletcher, 1974
Zamarada rupta D. S. Fletcher, 1974
Zamarada sagitta D. S. Fletcher, 1974
Zamarada schalida D. S. Fletcher, 1974
Zamarada sicula D. S. Fletcher, 1974
Zamarada subincolaris Gaede, 1915
Zamarada suda D. S. Fletcher, 1974
Zamarada thalia Oberthür, 1912
Zamarada tortura D. S. Fletcher, 1974
Zamarada triangularis Gaede, 1915
Zamarada tullia Oberthür, 1913
Zamarada umbra Pierre-Baltus, 2006
Zamarada undimarginata Warren, 1897
Zamarada urania Oberthür, 1912
Zamarada variola D. S. Fletcher, 1974
Zamarada volsella D. S. Fletcher, 1974
Zamarada vulpina Warren, 1897
Zamarada xystra D. S. Fletcher, 1974

Lasiocampidae
Cheligium choerocampoides (Holland, 1893)
Cheligium licrisonia Zolotuhin & Gurkovich, 2009
Cheligium lineatum (Aurivillius, 1893)
Cheligium pinheyi Zolotuhin & Gurkovich, 2009
Chrysopsyche viridescens (Holland, 1893)
Filiola occidentale (Strand, 1912)
Gastropacha africana (Holland, 1893)
Gastroplakaeis forficulatus (Möschler, 1887)
Gastroplakaeis greyi Holland, 1893
Gelo jordani (Tams, 1936)
Gonobombyx angulata Aurivillius, 1893
Gonometa bicolor Dewitz, 1881
Gonometa titan Holland, 1893
Gonopacha brotoessa (Holland, 1893)
Hypotrabala castanea Holland, 1893
Leipoxais major Holland, 1893
Leipoxais makomona Strand, 1912
Leipoxais marginepunctata Holland, 1893
Leipoxais obscura Aurivillius, 1908
Leipoxais peraffinis Holland, 1893
Leipoxais rufobrunnea Strand, 1912
Mallocampa audea (Druce, 1887)
Mallocampa leucophaea (Holland, 1893)
Mallocampa porphyria (Holland, 1893)
Mimopacha cinerascens (Holland, 1893)
Morongea avoniffi (Tams, 1929)
Morongea cruenta Zolotuhin & Prozorov, 2010
Morongea flavipicta (Tams, 1929)
Morongea gemmo Zolotuhin & Prozorov, 2010
Muzunguja rectilineata (Aurivillius, 1900)
Nepehria olivia Gurkovich & Zolotuhin, 2010
Opisthodontia diva Zolotuhin & Prozorov, 2010
Opisthodontia supramalis Zolotuhin & Prozorov, 2010
Opisthoheza heza Zolotuhin & Prozorov, 2010
Pachymeta immunda (Holland, 1893)
Pachymetana niveoplaga (Aurivillius, 1900)
Pachypasa directa (Mabille, 1893)
Pachytrina crestalina Zolotuhin & Gurkovich, 2009
Pachytrina gliharta Zolotuhin & Gurkovich, 2009
Pachytrina honrathii (Dewitz, 1881)
Pachytrina okzilina Zolotuhin & Gurkovich, 2009
Pachytrina papyroides (Tams, 1936)
Pachytrina wenigina Zolotuhin & Gurkovich, 2009
Pallastica mesoleuca (Strand, 1911)
Philotherma spargata (Holland, 1893)
Pseudometa minima (Holland, 1893)
Sonitha alucard Zolotuhin & Prozorov, 2010
Sonitha bernardii Zolotuhin & Prozorov, 2010
Sonitha chocolatina Zolotuhin & Prozorov, 2010
Sonitha gelata Zolotuhin & Prozorov, 2010
Sonitha libera (Aurivillius, 1914)
Sonitha picassoi Zolotuhin & Prozorov, 2010
Stenophatna dentata (Aurivillius, 1899)
Stenophatna foedifraga Zolotuhin & Prozorov, 2010
Stenophatna hollandi (Tams, 1929)
Stoermeriana directa (Mabille, 1893)
Stoermeriana fuliginosa (Holland, 1893)
Stoermeriana livida (Holland, 1893)
Streblote tessmanni (Strand, 1912)
Theophasida obusta (Tams, 1929)
Theophasida valkyria Zolotuhin & Prozorov, 2010

Limacodidae
Chrysectropa roseofasciata (Aurivillius, 1900)
Chrysopoloma theorini Aurivillius, 1891
Latoia urda (Druce, 1887)
Parasa princeps Aurivillius, 1900

Lymantriidae
Abynotha hylomima (Holland, 1893)
Aroa nigripicta Holland, 1893
Batella muscosa (Holland, 1893)
Crorema setinoides (Holland, 1893)
Dasychira agrotoides (Holland, 1893)
Dasychira albibasalis (Holland, 1893)
Dasychira albicostata (Holland, 1893)
Dasychira albilinea (Holland, 1893)
Dasychira albinotata (Holland, 1893)
Dasychira albosignata Holland, 1893
Dasychira albospargata (Holland, 1893)
Dasychira apicata (Holland, 1893)
Dasychira arctioides (Holland, 1893)
Dasychira argiloides (Holland, 1893)
Dasychira brunneicosta (Holland, 1893)
Dasychira caeca (Plötz, 1880)
Dasychira chloromorpha (Holland, 1893)
Dasychira circumdata (Holland, 1893)
Dasychira clathrata (Holland, 1893)
Dasychira coeruleifascia (Holland, 1893)
Dasychira costiplaga (Holland, 1893)
Dasychira crucifera (Holland, 1893)
Dasychira delicata (Holland, 1893)
Dasychira diluta (Holland, 1893)
Dasychira erubescens (Holland, 1893)
Dasychira flava (Holland, 1893)
Dasychira fumosa (Holland, 1893)
Dasychira fuscula Hering, 1926
Dasychira gabunica Holland, ????
Dasychira gonophora (Holland, 1893)
Dasychira goodii (Holland, 1893)
Dasychira hyloica (Holland, 1893)
Dasychira hypnota (Collenette, 1960)
Dasychira miserata (Holland, 1893)
Dasychira nigristriata (Holland, 1893)
Dasychira notia Hering, 1926
Dasychira nubifera Holland, 1893
Dasychira nubilata (Holland, 1893)
Dasychira obscura (Holland, 1893)
Dasychira ocellata (Holland, 1893)
Dasychira ocellifera (Holland, 1893)
Dasychira proletaria (Holland, 1893)
Dasychira prospera Hering, 1926
Dasychira ruptilinea Holland, 1893
Dasychira striata (Holland, 1893)
Dasychira strigidentata Bethune-Baker, 1911
Dasychira thersites (Holland, 1893)
Dasychira viridipallens (Hering, 1926)
Dasychira viridis (Holland, 1893)
Eudasychira georgiana (Fawcett, 1900)
Eudasychira sublutescens (Holland, 1893)
Euproctidion gabunica Holland, 1893
Euproctidion pallida (Holland, 1893)
Euproctilla tesselata (Holland, 1893)
Euproctillina mesomelaena (Holland, 1893)
Euproctis albinula Hering, 1926
Euproctis apicipuncta (Holland, 1893)
Euproctis bigutta Holland, 1893
Euproctis discipuncta (Holland, 1893)
Euproctis melaleuca (Holland, 1893)
Euproctis nigra (Holland, 1893)
Euproctis palla (Holland, 1893)
Euproctis parallela (Holland, 1893)
Euproctis proxantha (Holland, 1893)
Euproctis rotunda (Holland, 1893)
Euproctis rubroguttata Aurivillius, 1904
Euproctis tessellata (Holland, 1893)
Euproctis xanthomelaena (Holland, 1893)
Hemerophanes hypoxantha (Holland, 1893)
Heteronygmia flavescens Holland, 1893
Heteronygmia manicata (Aurivillius, 1892)
Laelia barsineides Holland, 1893
Laelia basibrunnea (Holland, 1893)
Laelia hypoleucis Holland, 1893
Laelia lignicolor Holland, 1893
Laelia nubifuga (Holland, 1893)
Laelia omissa (Holland, 1893)
Laelia stigmatica (Holland, 1893)
Leucoma fusca (Hering, 1926)
Leucoma gracillima Holland, 1893
Leucoma luteipes (Walker, 1855)
Leucoma nigripes (Holland, 1893)
Leucoma ogovensis (Holland, 1893)
Leucoma xanthocephala (Hering, 1926)
Leucoma xanthosoma Saalmüller, 1884
Lomadonta erythrina Holland, 1893
Marbla divisa (Walker, 1855)
Olapa imitans Aurivillius, 1910
Olene basalis (Walker, 1855)
Otroeda hesperia (Cramer, 1779)
Otroeda nerina (Drury, 1780)
Otroeda permagnifica Holland, 1893
Otroeda vesperina Walker, 1854
Paqueta infima (Holland, 1893)
Pirga mirabilis (Aurivillius, 1891)
Rahona bicornuta Dall'Asta, 1981
Rahona caeruleibasalis Dall'Asta, 1981
Rahona collenettei Dall'Asta, 1981
Rahona hayesi Dall'Asta, 1981
Rahona subzairensis Dall'Asta, 1981
Rahona unica Dall'Asta, 1981
Stracena bananoides (Hering, 1927)
Stracena eximia (Holland, 1893)
Stracena promelaena (Holland, 1893)
Terphothrix lanaria Holland, 1893
Terphothrix tenuis (Holland, 1893)
Usimbara lata (Holland, 1893)

Metarbelidae
Haberlandia lindacammae Lehmann, 2011
Haberlandia odzalaensis Lehmann, 2011
Haberlandia shimonii Lehmann, 2011
Haberlandia legraini Lehmann, 2011
Lebedodes cossula Holland, 1893
Metarbela stivafer Holland, 1893

Noctuidae
Achaea xanthodera (Holland, 1894)
Acontia citrelinea Bethune-Baker, 1911
Acontia glaphyra Holland, 1894
Aegocera rectilinea Boisduval, 1836
Aegocera tigrina (Druce, 1882)
Ametropalpis vidua (Holland, 1894)
Callopistria complicata (Holland, 1894)
Callopistria cornuscopiae (Holland, 1894)
Callopistria maillardi (Guenée, 1862)
Cerynea flavicostata (Holland, 1894)
Chalciope pusilla (Holland, 1894)
Crameria amabilis (Drury, 1773)
Ctenoplusia dorfmeisteri (Felder & Rogenhofer, 1874)
Ctenoplusia furcifera (Walker, 1857)
Dysgonia conjunctura (Walker, 1858)
Dysgonia humilis Holland, 1894
Dysgonia multilineata (Holland, 1894)
Dysgonia palpalis (Walker, 1865)
Eutelia menalcas (Holland, 1894)
Eutelia morosa (Holland, 1894)
Eutelia solitaria (Holland, 1894)
Eutelia strigula Holland, 1894
Feliniopsis annosa (Viette, 1963)
Heliophisma catocalina Holland, 1894
Heraclia aemulatrix (Westwood, 1881)
Heraclia deficiens (Mabille & Vuillot, 1892)
Heraclia geryon (Fabricius, 1781)
Heraclia hornimani (Druce, 1880)
Heraclia medeba (Druce, 1880)
Hypotuerta transiens (Hampson, 1901)
Lophoruza semiscripta (Mabille, 1893)
Marcipa aequatorialis Pelletier, 1975
Marcipa argyrosemioides Pelletier, 1975
Marcipa bernardii Pelletier, 1974
Marcipa mariaeclarae Pelletier, 1975
Marcipa splendens Pelletier, 1975
Marcipalina laportei (Pelletier, 1975)
Marcipalina violacea (Pelletier, 1974)
Masalia galatheae (Wallengren, 1856)
Mimasura clara (Holland, 1893)
Nyodes brevicornis (Walker, 1857)
Omphaloceps triangularis (Mabille, 1893)
Ophiusa david (Holland, 1894)
Ophiusa despecta (Holland, 1894)
Ophiusa verecunda (Holland, 1894)
Oruza divisa (Walker, 1862)
Oruza latifera (Walker, 1869)
Ozarba domina (Holland, 1894)
Parachalciope benitensis (Holland, 1894)
Parachalciope binaria (Holland, 1894)
Parachalciope inornata (Holland, 1894)
Plecopterodes moderata (Wallengren, 1860)
Plusiopalpa dichora Holland, 1894
Plusiotricha livida Holland, 1894
Pseudoarcte melanis (Mabille, 1890)
Sarothroceras banaka (Plötz, 1880)
Schausia gladiatoria (Holland, 1893)
Sciatta inconcisa Walker, 1869
Soloe trigutta Walker, 1854
Soloella guttivaga (Walker, 1854)
Sypnoides equatorialis (Holland, 1894)
Thyas rubricata (Holland, 1894)
Thysanoplusia sestertia (Felder & Rogenhofer, 1874)

Nolidae
Blenina chloromelana (Mabille, 1890)
Blenina chrysochlora (Walker, 1865)
Earias ogovana Holland, 1893
Eligma hypsoides (Walker, 1869)
Gigantoceras geometroptera Holland, 1893
Gigantoceras solstitialis Holland, 1893
Hypodeva barbata Holland, 1894
Metaleptina albibasis Holland, 1893
Metaleptina nigribasis Holland, 1893
Metaleptina obliterata Holland, 1893
Negeta mesoleuca (Holland, 1894)
Nola chia (Holland, 1894)
Nola juvenis (Holland, 1893)
Odontestis prosticta (Holland, 1894)
Periplusia cinerascens Holland, 1894
Periplusia nubilicosta Holland, 1894
Plusiocalpe pallida Holland, 1894
Westermannia anchorita Holland, 1893
Westermannia goodi Hampson, 1912

Notodontidae
Acroctena pallida (Butler, 1882)
Afrocerura cameroona (Bethune-Baker, 1927)
Antheua gallans (Karsch, 1895)
Antheua simplex Walker, 1855
Antitrotonotus gabonensis Kiriakoff, 1966
Aoba grassei Kiriakoff, 1966
Aoba tosta Kiriakoff, 1965
Arciera grisea (Holland, 1893)
Bernardita albiplagiata (Gaede, 1928)
Bisolita minuta (Holland, 1893)
Blacodes friedae Kiriakoff, 1959
Bostrychogyna bella (Bethune-Baker, 1913)
Brachychira alternata Kiriakoff, 1966
Brachychira argentina Kiriakoff, 1955
Brachychira bernardii Kiriakoff, 1966
Brachychira destituta Kiriakoff, 1966
Brachychira dives Kiriakoff, 1960
Brachychira excellens (Rothschild, 1917)
Brachychira exusta Kiriakoff, 1966
Brachychira incerta Kiriakoff, 1966
Brachychira murina Kiriakoff, 1966
Brachychira punctulata Kiriakoff, 1966
Brachychira subargentea Kiriakoff, 1955
Catarctia biseriata (Plötz, 1880)
Catarctia divisa (Walker, 1855)
Catarctia terminipuncta Hampson, 1910
Cerurina marshalli (Hampson, 1910)
Deinarchia apateloides (Holland, 1893)
Desmeocraera bitioides (Holland, 1893)
Desmeocraera chloeropsis (Holland, 1893)
Desmeocraera falsa (Holland, 1893)
Desmeocraera formosa Kiriakoff, 1958
Desmeocraera glauca Gaede, 1928
Desmeocraera hinnula Holland, 1893
Desmeocraera latex (Druce, 1901)
Desmeocraera propinqua (Holland, 1893)
Desmeocraera squamipennis (Holland, 1893)
Desmeocraera varia (Walker, 1855)
Desmeocraerula conspicuana Kiriakoff, 1968
Desmeocraerula inconspicuana Strand, 1912
Desmeocraerula pallida Kiriakoff, 1963
Desmeocraerula senicula Kiriakoff, 1963
Desmeocraerula subangulata Kiriakoff, 1968
Desmeocraerula viridipicta Kiriakoff, 1963
Dinotodonta longa Holland, 1893
Elaphrodes duplex (Gaede, 1928)
Enomotarcha chloana (Holland, 1893)
Epanaphe carteri (Walsingham, 1885)
Epanaphe clara (Holland, 1893)
Epidonta brunneomixta (Mabille, 1897)
Epidonta transversa (Gaede, 1928)
Epitrotonotus vilis (Holland, 1893)
Eurystauridia dorsalis Kiriakoff, 1967
Galanthella arctipennis (Holland, 1893)
Galanthella evides Kiriakoff, 1959
Harpandrya aeola Bryk, 1913
Harpandrya cinerea Kiriakoff, 1966
Harpandrya gemella Kiriakoff, 1966
Harpandrya josepha Kiriakoff, 1966
Harpandrya rea Kiriakoff, 1966
Harpandrya recussa Kiriakoff, 1966
Iridoplitis theodorus Kiriakoff, 1967
Janthinisca flavescens Kiriakoff, 1960
Janthinisca flavipennis (Hampson, 1910)
Janthinisca signifera (Holland, 1893)
Macronadata collaris Möschler, 1887
Macronadata tigris Kiriakoff, 1966
Macrosenta longicauda Holland, 1893
Mesonadata quinquemaculata Kiriakoff, 1960
Odontoperas archonta Kiriakoff, 1959
Odontoperas cyanogramma Kiriakoff, 1968
Odontoperas dentigera Kiriakoff, 1962
Odontoperas lineata Kiriakoff, 1968
Paratrotonotus ogovensis (Holland, 1893)
Peratodonta olivacea Gaede, 1928
Peratodonta umbrosa Kiriakoff, 1968
Pittheides chloauchena (Holland, 1893)
Pseudobarobata denticulata Kiriakoff, 1966
Pseudobarobata integra Kiriakoff, 1966
Pseudoscrancia africana (Holland, 1893)
Pyrsopsyche pyrrhias Kiriakoff, 1968
Quista arenacea Kiriakoff, 1968
Quista conformis Kiriakoff, 1968
Quista niveiplaga (Hampson, 1910)
Quista subcarnea Kiriakoff, 1968
Scalmicauda acamas Kiriakoff, 1968
Scalmicauda actor Kiriakoff, 1968
Scalmicauda afra Kiriakoff, 1968
Scalmicauda agasthenes Kiriakoff, 1968
Scalmicauda albobrunnea Kiriakoff, 1968
Scalmicauda amphion Kiriakoff, 1968
Scalmicauda ancaeus Kiriakoff, 1968
Scalmicauda andraemon Kiriakoff, 1968
Scalmicauda antiphus Kiriakoff, 1968
Scalmicauda astyoche Kiriakoff, 1968
Scalmicauda benga Holland, 1893
Scalmicauda bernardii Kiriakoff, 1968
Scalmicauda bicolorata Gaede, 1928
Scalmicauda brevipennis (Holland, 1893)
Scalmicauda chalcedona Kiriakoff, 1968
Scalmicauda corona Kiriakoff, 1968
Scalmicauda decorata Kiriakoff, 1962
Scalmicauda epistrophus Kiriakoff, 1968
Scalmicauda eumela Kiriakoff, 1968
Scalmicauda fuscinota Aurivillius, 1904
Scalmicauda hoesemanni (Strand, 1911)
Scalmicauda lineata (Holland, 1893)
Scalmicauda lycaon Kiriakoff, 1968
Scalmicauda macrosema Kiriakoff, 1959
Scalmicauda myrine Kiriakoff, 1968
Scalmicauda oileus Kiriakoff, 1968
Scalmicauda orthogramma Kiriakoff, 1960
Scalmicauda pandarus Kiriakoff, 1968
Scalmicauda paucinotata Kiriakoff, 1959
Scalmicauda phorcys Kiriakoff, 1968
Scalmicauda podarce Kiriakoff, 1968
Scalmicauda pylaemenes Kiriakoff, 1968
Scalmicauda talaeon Kiriakoff, 1968
Scalmicauda tessmanni (Strand, 1911)
Scalmicauda thessala Kiriakoff, 1968
Scalmicauda uniarcuata Kiriakoff, 1962
Scrancia aesalon Kiriakoff, 1967
Scrancia atribasalis Kiriakoff, 1967
Scrancia hypotriorchis Kiriakoff, 1967
Scrancia modesta Holland, 1893
Scrancia nisus Kiriakoff, 1967
Scrancia osica Kiriakoff, 1967
Scrancia tinnunculus Kiriakoff, 1967
Stauropussa chloe (Holland, 1893)
Synete aberrans Kiriakoff, 1968
Synete argentescens (Hampson, 1910)
Synete boops Kiriakoff, 1968
Synete frugalis Kiriakoff, 1959
Synete julia Kiriakoff, 1968
Synete olivaceofusca (Rothschild, 1917)
Synete schistacea Kiriakoff, 1968
Synete semiarcuata Kiriakoff, 1968
Synete streptopelia Kiriakoff, 1959
Synete ursula Kiriakoff, 1968
Tmetopteryx bisecta (Rothschild, 1917)
Trabanta ignobilis (Holland, 1893)
Tricholoba atriclathrata Hampson, 1910
Tricholoba immodica Strand, 1911
Tricholoba intensiva Gaede, 1928
Tricholoba trisignata Strand, 1911

Psychidae
Eumeta cervina Druce, 1887
Eumeta rougeoti Bourgogne, 1955
Eumeta strandi Bourgogne, 1955

Pterophoridae
Emmelina lochmaius (Bigot, 1974)
Pterophorus candidalis (Walker, 1864)
Pterophorus lampra (Bigot, 1969)

Saturniidae
Athletes ethra (Westwood, 1849)
Bunaeopsis aurantiaca (Rothschild, 1895)
Carnegia mirabilis (Aurivillius, 1895)
Epiphora albidus (Druce, 1886)
Epiphora berliozi (Rougeot, 1948)
Epiphora gabonensis (Testout, 1936)
Epiphora testouti (Rougeot, 1948)
Goodia lunata Holland, 1893
Goodia nubilata Holland, 1893
Imbrasia epimethea (Drury, 1772)
Imbrasia longicaudata Holland, 1894
Lobobunaea goodi (Holland, 1893)
Lobobunaea melanoneura (Rothschild, 1907)
Lobobunaea niepelti Strand, 1914
Ludia orinoptena Karsch, 1892
Micragone agathylla (Westwood, 1849)
Micragone colettae Rougeot, 1959
Micragone lichenodes (Holland, 1893)
Micragone martinae Rougeot, 1952
Micragone mirei Darge, 1990
Nudaurelia anthinoides Rougeot, 1978
Nudaurelia bouvieri (Le Moult, 1933)
Nudaurelia dione (Fabricius, 1793)
Nudaurelia dionysiae Rougeot, 1948
Nudaurelia eblis Strecker, 1876
Nudaurelia melanops (Bouvier, 1930)
Orthogonioptilum bernardii Bouyer, 1990
Orthogonioptilum diabolicum Rougeot, 1971
Orthogonioptilum luminosa (Bouvier, 1930)
Orthogonioptilum modestum Rougeot, 1965
Orthogonioptilum ochraceum Rougeot, 1958
Orthogonioptilum piersoni Bouyer, 1989
Orthogonioptilum subueleense Rougeot, 1972
Orthogonioptilum vestigiata (Holland, 1893)
Pseudantheraea discrepans (Butler, 1878)
Pseudantheraea imperator Rougeot, 1962
Pseudimbrasia deyrollei (J. Thomson, 1858)
Tagoropsis genoviefae Rougeot, 1950

Sesiidae
Albuna dybowskyi Le Cerf, 1917
Alonina longipes (Holland, 1894)
Chamanthedon brillians (Beutenmüller, 1899)
Chamanthedon tropica (Beutenmüller, 1899)
Conopia gabuna (Beutenmüller, 1899)
Conopia leucogaster Hampson, 1919
Conopia nuba (Beutenmüller, 1899)
Conopia olenda (Beutenmüller, 1899)
Episannina ellenbergeri Le Cerf, 1917
Episannina perlucida (Le Cerf, 1911)
Macrotarsipus africanus (Beutenmüller, 1899)
Melittia azrael Le Cerf, 1914
Similipepsis violacea Le Cerf, 1911
Synanthedon nyanga (Beutenmüller, 1899)
Tipulamima festiva (Beutenmüller, 1899)
Tipulamima flavifrons Holland, 1894
Tipulamima haugi (Le Cerf, 1917)
Tipulamima malimba (Beutenmüller, 1899)

Sphingidae
Acanthosphinx guessfeldti (Dewitz, 1879)
Acherontia atropos (Linnaeus, 1758)
Agrius convolvuli (Linnaeus, 1758)
Antinephele achlora Holland, 1893
Antinephele camerounensis Clark, 1937
Antinephele efulani Clark, 1926
Antinephele lunulata Rothschild & Jordan, 1903
Antinephele maculifera Holland, 1889
Antinephele marcida Holland, 1893
Antinephele muscosa Holland, 1889
Atemnora westermannii (Boisduval, 1875)
Avinoffia hollandi (Clark, 1917)
Basiothia charis (Boisduval, 1875)
Basiothia medea (Fabricius, 1781)
Centroctena rutherfordi (Druce, 1882)
Cephonodes hylas (Linnaeus, 1771)
Chloroclanis virescens (Butler, 1882)
Coelonia fulvinotata (Butler, 1875)
Daphnis nerii (Linnaeus, 1758)
Euchloron megaera (Linnaeus, 1758)
Falcatula cymatodes (Rothschild & Jordan, 1912)
Grillotius bergeri (Darge, 1973)
Hippotion balsaminae (Walker, 1856)
Hippotion celerio (Linnaeus, 1758)
Hippotion eson (Cramer, 1779)
Hippotion irregularis (Walker, 1856)
Hippotion osiris (Dalman, 1823)
Hyles livornica (Esper, 1780)
Hypaedalea butleri Rothschild, 1894
Hypaedalea insignis Butler, 1877
Leptoclanis pulchra Rothschild & Jordan, 1903
Leucophlebia afra Karsch, 1891
Leucostrophus commasiae (Walker, 1856)
Lycosphingia hamatus (Dewitz, 1879)
Macroglossum trochilus (Hübner, 1823)
Macropoliana natalensis (Butler, 1875)
Neopolyptychus convexus (Rothschild & Jordan, 1903)
Neopolyptychus pygarga (Karsch, 1891)
Neopolyptychus serrator (Jordan, 1929)
Nephele accentifera (Palisot de Beauvois, 1821)
Nephele aequivalens (Walker, 1856)
Nephele bipartita Butler, 1878
Nephele comma Hopffer, 1857
Nephele discifera Karsch, 1891
Nephele funebris (Fabricius, 1793)
Nephele maculosa Rothschild & Jordan, 1903
Nephele oenopion (Hübner, [1824])
Nephele peneus (Cramer, 1776)
Nephele rectangulata Rothschild, 1895
Nephele rosae Butler, 1875
Pantophaea favillacea (Walker, 1866)
Phylloxiphia bicolor (Rothschild, 1894)
Phylloxiphia formosa (Schultze, 1914)
Phylloxiphia goodii (Holland, 1889)
Phylloxiphia illustris (Rothschild & Jordan, 1906)
Phylloxiphia karschi (Rothschild & Jordan, 1903)
Phylloxiphia oberthueri (Rothschild & Jordan, 1903)
Phylloxiphia oweni (Carcasson, 1968)
Phylloxiphia vicina (Rothschild & Jordan, 1915)
Platysphinx constrigilis (Walker, 1869)
Platysphinx stigmatica (Mabille, 1878)
Platysphinx vicaria Jordan, 1920
Poliana buchholzi (Plötz, 1880)
Polyptychoides digitatus (Karsch, 1891)
Polyptychus affinis Rothschild & Jordan, 1903
Polyptychus andosa Walker, 1856
Polyptychus anochus Rothschild & Jordan, 1906
Polyptychus baltus Pierre, 1985
Polyptychus barnsi Clark, 1926
Polyptychus bernardii Rougeot, 1966
Polyptychus carteri (Butler, 1882)
Polyptychus enodia (Holland, 1889)
Polyptychus herbuloti Darge, 1990
Polyptychus hollandi Rothschild & Jordan, 1903
Polyptychus lapidatus Joicey & Kaye, 1917
Polyptychus murinus Rothschild, 1904
Polyptychus nigriplaga Rothschild & Jordan, 1903
Polyptychus orthographus Rothschild & Jordan, 1903
Polyptychus paupercula (Holland, 1889)
Polyptychus rougeoti Carcasson, 1968
Polyptychus sinus Pierre, 1985
Polyptychus thihongae Bernardi, 1970
Polyptychus trisecta (Aurivillius, 1901)
Pseudenyo benitensis Holland, 1889
Pseudoclanis admatha Pierre, 1985
Pseudoclanis occidentalis Rothschild & Jordan, 1903
Rhadinopasa hornimani (Druce, 1880)
Rufoclanis rosea (Druce, 1882)
Sphingonaepiopsis nana (Walker, 1856)
Temnora angulosa Rothschild & Jordan, 1906
Temnora atrofasciata Holland, 1889
Temnora avinoffi Clark, 1919
Temnora camerounensis Clark, 1923
Temnora crenulata (Holland, 1893)
Temnora curtula Rothschild & Jordan, 1908
Temnora elegans (Rothschild, 1895)
Temnora elisabethae Hering, 1930
Temnora eranga (Holland, 1889)
Temnora fumosa (Walker, 1856)
Temnora funebris (Holland, 1893)
Temnora griseata Rothschild & Jordan, 1903
Temnora hollandi Clark, 1920
Temnora iapygoides (Holland, 1889)
Temnora livida (Holland, 1889)
Temnora nephele Clark, 1922
Temnora ntombi Darge, 1975
Temnora pseudopylas (Rothschild, 1894)
Temnora radiata (Karsch, 1892)
Temnora rattrayi Rothschild, 1904
Temnora reutlingeri (Holland, 1889)
Temnora sardanus (Walker, 1856)
Temnora scitula (Holland, 1889)
Temnora spiritus (Holland, 1893)
Temnora stevensi Rothschild & Jordan, 1903
Temnora wollastoni Rothschild & Jordan, 1908
Temnora zantus (Herrich-Schäffer, 1854)
Theretra jugurtha (Boisduval, 1875)
Theretra orpheus (Herrich-Schäffer, 1854)
Xanthopan morganii (Walker, 1856)

Thyrididae
Arniocera viridifasciata (Aurivillius, 1900)
Byblisia setipes (Plötz, 1880)
Chrysotypus luteofuscus Whalley, 1971
Dysodia collinsi Whalley, 1968
Marmax hyparchus (Cramer, 1779)
Marmax semiaurata (Walker, 1854)
Ninia plumipes (Drury, 1782)
Toosa longipes (Holland, 1896)
Trichobaptes auristrigata (Plötz, 1880)

Tineidae
Cimitra efformata (Gozmány, 1965)
Perissomastix mili Gozmány, 1965

Tortricidae
Accra ornata Razowski, 1966
Eccopsis wahlbergiana Zeller, 1852
Idiothauma africanum Walsingham, 1897
Mictocommosis argus (Walsingham, 1897)

Zygaenidae
Chalconycles chloauges (Holland, 1893)
Homophylotis obscurissimus (Holland, 1893)
Syringura triplex (Plötz, 1880)

References

External links 

Moths
Moths
Gabon
Gabon